Usnea glabrata is a species of beard lichen in the family Parmeliaceae. It was first described as a variety of Usnea plicata by Erik Acharius. Finnish lichenologist Edvard August Vainio transferred it to the genus Usnea in 1915. The lichen grows on bark and is widespread throughout Europe, although it is probably locally extinct in a few locations. It is characterized by small shrubby thallus, constriction of secondary branches at their base, presence of large soralia, and the absence of both papillae and isidia.

References

glabrata
Lichen species
Lichens described in 1810
Lichens of Europe
Taxa named by Erik Acharius